Sven Dhoest (born 9 April 1994) is a Belgian professional footballer who plays as a goalkeeper for Knokke.

Career
Ahead of the 2019–20 season, Dhoest joined Knokke. The two-year deal was already signed in February 2019.

References

External links

Sven Dhoest at Footballdatabase

1994 births
Living people
Belgian footballers
Belgium youth international footballers
Club Brugge KV players
Royal Excel Mouscron players
Footballers from Bruges
Belgian Pro League players
Association football goalkeepers
Sint-Eloois-Winkel Sport players